F.C. Bolzano 1996 was an Italian association football club located in Bolzano (German: Bozen). Its colors were white and red.

Founded in 1931 as A.C. Bolzano, in 2015 it merged with A.C. Virtus Don Bosco, creating a new club called A.C. Virtus Bolzano.

External links
 Official homepage

Football clubs in Italy
Football clubs in South Tyrol
Bolzano
Association football clubs established in 1931
Association football clubs disestablished in 2015
Serie B clubs
Serie C clubs
1931 establishments in Italy
2015 disestablishments in Italy